Evoxine (haploperine) is a furoquinoline alkaloid with hypnotic and sedative effects. It is found naturally in a variety of Australian and African plants including Evodia xanthoxyloides and Teclea gerrardii.

References

Hypnotics
Phenol ethers
Vicinal diols
Oxygen heterocycles
Quinoline alkaloids
Heterocyclic compounds with 3 rings